This is a list of WBC Muaythai female international challenge winners, showing every female "international challenge" match winner certificated by the World Boxing Council Muaythai (WBC Muaythai). The WBC, which is one of the four major governing bodies in professional boxing, started certifying their own Muay Thai world champions in 19 different weight classes in 2005.

The international challenge matches are for the competitors who are not qualified for the official championships, therefore it is not championship. In addition, it is completely different from "international championships".  The winners of international challenge matches are given commemorative belts.

Super bantamweight

Super flyweight

See also
List of WBC Muaythai diamond champions
List of WBC Muaythai female world champions
List of WBC Muaythai female international champions
List of WBC Muaythai international challenge winners

References

Lists of Muay Thai champions
WBC